Charlie Wakefield is the name of:

Charlie Wakefield (footballer, born 1998), English footballer for Chelsea and Coventry
Charlie Wakefield (footballer, born 2000), English footballer for Chesterfield